Acrocercops caementosa is a moth of the family Gracillariidae, known from Peru. It was described by E. Meyrick in 1915.

References

caementosa
Moths of South America
Moths described in 1915